El Expreso de la Costa is a Chilean online newspaper, formerly a monthly newspaper, based in Pichilemu, O'Higgins Region. El Expreso circulated throughout the Cardenal Caro Province, of which Pichilemu is the capital.

The newspaper is directed by Félix Calderón Vargas. El Expreso first edition was published on 30 June 2000, with ten more editions coming later until the newspaper's suspension in that same year. The newspaper was re-activated in 2005, with its twelfth edition published on 7 October of that year; El Expreso was continuously published until July 2015.

See also

 Radio Atardecer

References

External links

 El Expreso de la Costa 

2000 establishments in Chile
2000 disestablishments in Chile
2005 establishments in Chile
Mass media in Pichilemu
Newspapers published in Chile
Newspapers established in 2000
Publications disestablished in 2000
Newspapers established in 2005
Spanish-language newspapers
Online newspapers with defunct print editions